Onitsuka is a Japanese surname. Notable people with the surname include:

, Japanese singer-songwriter
, Japanese jazz drummer
Kihachiro Onitsuka (鬼塚喜八郎 1918-2007), Japanese entrepreneur

See also
Onitsuka Tiger, a Japanese shoe company

Japanese-language surnames